Michael Forsberg is conservation photographer who has dedicated 25 years of his life to photograph America's Great Plains, once one of the greatest grassland ecosystems on Earth. He is best known for his images of the Great Plains, wildlife, landscapes, sandhill cranes, and watersheds. His images have been featured in publications including National Geographic, Audubon, Outdoor Photographer, and the Nature Conservancy. 

In 1999, Michael embarked on a mission to photograph and write a book documenting the migration of the sandhill cranes. The book, On Ancient Wings: The Sandhill Cranes of North America was self-published in 2004. From 2005 to 2008 Michael traveled 100,000 miles in twelve states and three Canadian provinces taking the photographs that appear in the book Great Plains: America's Lingering Wild, published by the University of Chicago Press in 2009. In 2011 Michael co-founded the Platte Basin Timelapse project (PBT) in partnership with the University of Nebraska. Today it operates as a long-term documentary project using time-lapse photography and multimedia storytelling to put a Great Plains watershed in motion. In August 2018, the PBS documentary about the project titled, Follow the Water was released in Nebraska and is scheduled to be released nationally on Earth Day 2019. 

In 2017, Michael received the Environmental Impact Award from the North American Nature Photography Association, and the Ansel Adams Award for Conservation Photography. In 2011 his image of tallgrass prairie was featured on a USPS's stamp, and then in 2018 his image of sandhill cranes over the Platte River was featured.

Some of his work is found in the Great Plains Art Museum of the Center for Great Plains Studies at the University of Nebraska–Lincoln.

Michael is currently an associate professor of practice at the University of Nebraska and is a Faculty Fellow with the Daugherty Water for Food Global Institute and is a Fellow with the Center for Great Plains Studies. 

Michael is a Senior Fellow of the International League of Conservation Photographers.

Awards 

 Ansel Adams     Award for Conservation Photography, Sierra Club - 2017
 Nebraska Statehood Forever Stamp, US Postal Service -     2017
 One of the selected 150 Notable Nebraskans - 2017
 Environmental Impact Award, North American Nature     Photographers Association (NANPA) - 2017
 Nebraska Master Naturalist - 2016
 Legislative Resolution 627, the Legislature applauds     and commends Michael Forsberg - 2016
 Mission Award, North American Nature Photographers     Association (NANPA) - 2009
 Conservation Education Award, The Wildlife Society -     2004
 Highly Commended in the BBC's International Wildlife     Photographer of the Year - 2003
 Award of Excellence in the Science/Natural History     category of the 58th Annual Pictures of the Year (POY) - 2001

See also 

 Conservation photography
 Nature photography
 Wildlife photography

References

External links 
Michael Forsberg Photography
International League of Conservation Photographers
North American Nature Photographers Association
A gallery of 24 photographs from The Great Plains: America's Lingering Wild

American photographers
Artists from Nebraska
Living people
Year of birth missing (living people)